Joan Jorquera Cala (born 14 July 2000) is a Spanish taekwondo athlete. He won one of the bronze medals in the men's bantamweight event at the 2022 World Taekwondo Championships held in Guadalajara, Mexico. He won the silver medal in his debut at the European Taekwondo Championships men's under 63 kgs.

References

External links 

 

Spanish male taekwondo practitioners
Living people
2000 births
European Taekwondo Championships medalists
World Taekwondo Championships medalists
21st-century Spanish people